Halloweentown High (also known as Halloweentown 3) is a 2004 Disney Channel Original Movie that premiered on Disney Channel on October 8, 2004, for the holiday of Halloween. It drew 6.1 million viewers for its premiere. It is the third installment in the Halloweentown series.

Plot
One year after the previous movie, Marnie Piper prepares to begin a new school year. She asks the Halloweentown Council to work toward openness between Halloweentown and the mortal world. She proposes bringing a group of Halloweentown students to her own high school in the mortal world. The council is initially apprehensive, mostly due to the legend of the Knights of the Iron Dagger: a fanatical order of knights who wanted to destroy all things magical. The Halloweentown High Council, however, agrees to accept the plan after Marnie mistakenly bets "all the Cromwell magic" that her plan will work. If she does not prove she is right by midnight on Halloween, then her entire family will lose their magical abilities. Marnie, regretting what she said to the council, wants to cancel the program she has made, but her grandmother Aggie opposes, saying that they have nothing to fear.

The Halloweentown students arrive and are magically given human appearances to disguise their true non-human natures. School begins with Marnie acting as a tour guide for the exchange group, claiming they are from Canada. Aggie substitute teaches so she can be available in case of need. Cody, a new student, shows a romantic interest in Marnie.

While Aggie proves unable to teach any subject effectively, the Halloweentown students keep to themselves, hiding in the refuge that Aggie magically creates for them in a remote student locker. Marnie gradually encourages the students to join sports teams, school activities, and to make new friends.

Marnie's progress is interrupted by a warning that appears to be from the Knights of the Iron Dagger, then by a magical incident at the mall that results in the Halloweentown students assuming their natural appearances in public. This is followed by a break-in at the secret magical locker and the disappearance of Cassie.

Meanwhile, Marnie's developing relationship with Cody parallels an unexpected romance beginning between Aggie and the school's principal Phil Flannigan. Aggie suspects Cody of being the cause of the trouble and tries to convince Marnie to halt their relationship, but Marnie in turn suspects Flannigan. They eventually discover that Flannigan is the Knight in question; he was told prior to the students' arrival that he was the last of the Order.

Edgar Dalloway, head of the Witches' Council and father of one of the students, is the real root of their problems. He wants to keep Halloweentown isolated from the mortal world, and used Flannigan to ensure the failure of Marnie's project. This, he hoped, would cause a negative reaction in Halloweentown and keep the portal between Halloweentown and the mortal world closed.

The Halloweentown students use the school's Halloween carnival to improve mortal attitudes toward magical folk. Their haunted house depicts the ordinary lives of creatures that have typically been seen as monsters in the mortal world, including displays like the "Monster Tea Party" and ogres "picnicking in their natural setting", which winds up boring the carnival goers. Meanwhile, Marnie's mother Gwen uses a Witch's Glass to hunt down Cassie.

At the school carnival, Dalloway launches magical attacks against the mortal students by bringing the inanimate monsters in the haunted house to life. The ensuing panic spirals beyond Marnie's and Aggie's ability to contain the monsters. Flannigan incites a mob to corner the Halloweentown students. Cody tames the crowd, the students reveal themselves, and the crowd accepts them for who they are. Flannigan also renounces being a knight and accepts Aggie.

Dalloway claims the Cromwell magic and explains that his son Ethan helped with most of the things that happened, but Gwen has shown the evening's events to the Halloweentown High Council. They return the Cromwell magic, Gwen returns with the imprisoned student, and the Council imprisons Dalloway in another Witch's Glass taking his disagreement with them as a form of resignation and taking the families magic.

The portal between Halloweentown and the mortal world opens inside the haunted house, and crowds of children from Halloweentown cross over to enjoy the carnival together with children of the mortal world. Marnie flies off for a romantic broom ride with Cody. While flying over the carnival, they kiss.

Cast
 Kimberly J. Brown as Marnie Piper
 Debbie Reynolds as Aggie Cromwell
 Judith Hoag as Gwen Piper
 Joey Zimmerman as Dylan Piper
 Emily Roeske as Sophie Piper
 Finn Wittrock as Cody Trainer, a boy who becomes Marnie's love interest.
 Clifton Davis as Principal Phil Flannigan, the principal who is the last of the Knights of the Iron Dagger.
 Eliana Reyes as Cassie, a witch who is captured by Edgar.
 Lucas Grabeel as Ethan Dalloway
 Michael Flynn as Edgar Dalloway, a Halloweentown High Council member who plans to make sure Marnie fails.
 Olesya Rulin as Natalie, a pink troll who is Dylan's love interest.
 Todd Michael Schwartzman as Pete, a werewolf
 Jesse Harward as Chester, a blue-skinned monster who is the result of a union between a male ogre and a female forest giant.
 Clayton Taylor as Chester's human disguise
 Jeff Olson as the six-armed member of the Halloweentown High Council
 Frank Gerrish as the pumpkinhead member of the Halloweentown High Council
 Mowava Pryor as the vampire member of the Halloweentown High Council
 Frank Welker provided special vocal effects

See also
 Halloweentown (1998)
 Halloweentown II: Kalabar's Revenge (2001)
 Return to Halloweentown (2006)

References

External links
 
 

Halloweentown (film series)
Films shot in Utah
Television sequel films
2004 television films
2004 films
2000s English-language films
American films about Halloween
Films about witchcraft
Films directed by Mark A.Z. Dippé
American sequel films
2000s monster movies
American monster movies
2000s American films